The University of Jos, abbreviated as Unijos, is a Federal University in Jos, Plateau State, central Nigeria.

History

What became the University of Jos was established in November 1971 from the satellite campus of the University of Ibadan. The first students were admitted in January 1972 as pre-degree students and the first Bachelor of Arts degree program began in October 1973.  In October 1975, the then military government under General Murtala Mohammed established the Unijos as a separate institution.  The first Vice-Chancellor of the Unijos was Professor Gilbert Onuaguluchi.  Classes began at the newly reorganized University of Jos in October 1976 with 575 students spreading over the existing four faculties of Arts and Social Sciences, Education, Natural Sciences and Medical Sciences.  Post-graduate programs were added in 1977.  By 1978 Faculties of Law and Environmental Sciences were established and the Faculties of Arts and Social Sciences were separated.

In 2003, the Carnegie Corporation of New York gave Unijos a $2 million grant to form its own fundraising department.

Library 
Its an Academic library was established in 1962 to support teaching, learning and research which was located in campus of university of Ibadan before its move to jos. Presently. the library is located along Bauchi road opposite the Federal College of Forestry, Jos. the library has sections like serial unit, system unit, reserve unit and circulation unit.

Faculties

Notable alumni

Andrew Agwunobi, interim president of the University of Connecticut, U.S.
John O. Agwunobi, CEO of Herbalife Nutrition
Kayode Ajulo, Lawyer, Arbitrator, Right Activist & former National Secretary, Labour Party
Etannibi Alemika, first female professor of law from the Kogi State
 Charity Angya, former Vice-chancellor Benue State University
 Solomon Dalung, former lecturer in the Faculty of Law and Minister of Youth and Sports
 Yakubu Dogara, former speaker, House of Representatives
 Yusuf Adamu Gagdi, member, House of Representatives, Federal Republic of Nigeria
 Helon Habila, novelist
 Doug Kazé, musician, lecturer, novelist
 Esther Ibanga, pastor and peace prize winner
 Chukwuemeka Ike, novelist 
 Audu Maikori, lawyer, entrepreneur
 Ali Mazrui, Kenyan political scientist
 Saint Obi, Nigerian actor
 Ebikibina Ogborodi, acting registrar of NECO
 Edward David Onoja, Deputy Governor of Kogi State. 
 Viola Onwuliri, Minister of Foreign affairs & Minister of State for Education, Nigeria, Professor of Biochemistry
 Charles O'Tudor, brand strategist, entrepreneur
 Igho Sanomi, Nigerian businessman
 Pauline Tallen, Nigerian politician

Vice chancellors

Controversy 
On 4th March, 2022 a 300-level (Year 3) student of the institution committed suicide due to the strike of the Academic Staff Union of Universities. It was reported by PremiumTimes that the student had allegedly left a note stating his frustration as a result of the strike.

See also
 List of universities in Nigeria

References

External links
 University of Jos, official website
 Electronic School of Medicine
 UniJos suspends academic activities

Jos
Educational institutions established in 1975
Federal universities of Nigeria
1975 establishments in Nigeria